During the 1927–28 Scottish football season, Celtic competed in the Scottish First Division.

Results

Scottish First Division

Scottish Cup

Friendly
 
Challenge match between the Scottish Cup holders and English FA Cup holders.

References

Celtic F.C. seasons
Celtic